Patmore is a surname that refers to:
Alan Patmore (contemporary) American video game designer
Andy Patmore (born 1968), Australian rugby league player
Brigit Patmore (1888–1965), English writer
Coventry Patmore (1823–1896) English poet and critic
Derek Patmore (1908–1972), English writer
Nigel Patmore (born 1960), Australian field hockey player
Peter George Patmore (c. 1786 – 1855), British periodical writer
Peter Patmore (born 1952), Australian politician
Sharon Buchanan-Patmore (born 1963), Australian field hockey player
Simon Patmore (born 1987), Australian para-athlete
Warren Patmore (born 1971) English professional football player
Terry Patmore (1966-), Co-Founder of Unleashed Software